Shehab Qumbor  (born 10 August 1997) is a Palestinian footballer who plays as a forward for Jabal Al-Mukaber and the Palestine national team.

International career
He played in 2018 AFC U-23 Championship and scored a goal against Thailand in a 5–1 victory that assured Palestine a place in the quarter-finals.

He made his debut for the senior team on 18 January 2021 against Kuwait.

Honours
Al-Wehdat
Jordan FA Cup: 2022

References

External links
 
 

1997 births
Living people
Palestinian footballers
Association football forwards
Palestine international footballers
Palestine youth international footballers
Jabal Al-Mukaber Club players
Al-Wehdat SC players
Twin sportspeople
West Bank Premier League players
Footballers at the 2018 Asian Games